Tom Fitzpatrick (born 25 December 1974) is an Irish sailor. He competed in the 49er event at the 2004 Summer Olympics.

References

External links
 

1974 births
Living people
Irish male sailors (sport)
Olympic sailors of Ireland
Sailors at the 2004 Summer Olympics – 49er
Sportspeople from Dublin (city)